Four World Trade Center, building 4 of the World Trade Center in New York City was completed in 1975 at a height of 118 ft (36 m). It was heavily damaged during the September 11 attacks in 2001 by the collapse of the adjacent South Tower at 9:59 a.m. EDT and was eventually demolished in December 2001.
The following is a list of tenants of 4 World Trade Center prior to its destruction:

Totals 

According to CNN

References

External links
 Tenant list on cnn.com
 Verified lists on unb

World Trade Center
Lists of companies based in New York (state)
Manhattan-related lists
Four